Rhein-Neckar is an electoral constituency (German: Wahlkreis) represented in the Bundestag. It elects one member via first-past-the-post voting. Under the current constituency numbering system, it is designated as constituency 277. It is located in northwestern Baden-Württemberg, comprising most of the Rhein-Neckar-Kreis district.

Rhein-Neckar was created for the inaugural 1949 federal election. Since 2021, it has been represented by Moritz Oppelt of the Christian Democratic Union (CDU).

Geography
Rhein-Neckar is located in northwestern Baden-Württemberg. As of the 2021 federal election, it comprises the entirety of the Rhein-Neckar-Kreis district excluding the municipalities of Dossenheim, Edingen-Neckarhausen, Eppelheim, Heddesheim, Hemsbach, Hirschberg an der Bergstraße, Ilvesheim, Ladenburg, Laudenbach, Schriesheim, Weinheim, Altlußheim, Brühl, Hockenheim, Ketsch, Neulußheim, Oftersheim, Plankstadt, Reilingen, and Schwetzingen.

History
Rhein-Neckar was created in 1949, then known as Sinsheim. In the 1965 through 1976 elections, it was named Heidelberg-Land – Sinsheim. It acquired its current name in the 1980 election. In the 1949 election, it was Württemberg-Baden Landesbezirk Baden constituency 7 in the number system. In the 1953 through 1961 elections, it was number 181. In the 1965 through 1976 elections, it was number 184. In the 1980 through 1998 elections, it was number 182. In the 2002 and 2005 elections, it was number 278. Since the 2009 election, it has been number 277.

Originally, the constituency comprised the district of Mosbach as well as the Sinsheim district excluding the municipalities of Kürnbach, Mühlbach, Sulzfeld, and Zaisenhausen. In the 1965 through 1976 elections, it comprised the district of Sinsheim as well as the Landkreis Heidelberg district excluding the municipality of Eppelheim. It acquired its current borders in the 1980 election.

Members
The constituency has been held continuously by the Christian Democratic Union (CDU) since its creation. It was first represented by Eugen Leibfried from 1949 to 1957, followed by Fritz Baier from 1957 to 1976. Alfred Hubertus Neuhaus served from 1976 to 1983. Bernd Schmidbauer was representative from 1983 to 2009, a total of seven consecutive terms. Stephan Harbarth was elected in 2009, and re-elected in 2013 and 2017. He resigned in November 2018 after being elected to the Federal Constitutional Court. He was succeeded by Moritz Oppelt in the 2021 federal election.

Election results

2021 election

2017 election

2013 election

2009 election

References

Federal electoral districts in Baden-Württemberg
1949 establishments in West Germany
Constituencies established in 1949
Rhein-Neckar-Kreis